Charles Thomas Brues (June 20, 1879, Wheeling, West Virginia – July 22, 1955, Crescent City, Florida) was an American entomologist.

Biography
Brues studied at the University of Texas at Austin and at Columbia University. He was appointed field agent of the Bureau of Entomology, United States Department of Agriculture 1904-05, curator of invertebrate zoology at the Milwaukee Public Museum 1905-09, and then became instructor in economic entomology at Harvard University.

His contributions on embryology and the habits of insects, notably Hymenoptera (ants, bees, etc.) and Diptera (mosquitoes, flies, fleas, etc.) are highly instructive. He was editor of the Bulletin of the Wisconsin Natural History Society 1907-09, and in 1910 was appointed editor of Psyche, a journal of entomology.

In 1913, while employed at the Bussey Institution, he was part of a three-person team (along with Ernest Tyzzer and Dr. Richard P. Strong) that studied tropical diseases in Peru and Ecuador.

Brues is commemorated in the scientific name of a species of Caribbean snake, Mastigodryas bruesi.

Works
A Key to the Families of North American Insects (1915). Scanned version. (with Axel Leonard Melander).
Insects and Human Welfare (1920, reprinted 1947). 
Classification of Insects (1931). 
 Insect Dietary : An Account of the Food Habits of Insects (1945).

References

Sources
Allen G. Debus (Editor) (1968). World Who’s Who in Science. A Biographical Dictionary of Notable Scientists from Antiquity to the Present. Chicago: Marquis-Who’s Who. xvi + 1,855 pp. 
French Wikipedia

External links

American entomologists
1879 births
1955 deaths
University of Texas at Austin alumni
Columbia University alumni
People from Wheeling, West Virginia
People from Crescent City, Florida